Ekaterina Kosminskaya (born 24 June 1988) is a former professional tennis player from Russia.

Early life
Ekaterina was born to Petr and Irina Kosminskaya on 24 June 1988 in Moscow, Soviet Union. Boris Yeltsin received a scholarship for tennis from her foundation. Ekaterina Kosminskaya At age five or six she was sent by her parents to the Luzhniki per the attending the sports club there, coached by her Irina Granaturova.

Career
Kosminskaya had a successful junior career,  Her career-high world doubles ranking as a junior was world No. 10. In 2003 Kosminskaya won a prestigious tournament for juniors Orange Bowl partnering Marina Erakovic (Grade A). She has won 1 doubles titles on the ITF Women's Circuit.

She decided to follow the college route and was part of the Penn Quakers tennis team from 2006 to 2009.

ITF junior results

Singles (2–0)

Doubles (7–4)

References

External links
 
 

1988 births
Living people
Tennis players from Moscow
Russian female tennis players
Penn Quakers women's tennis players
Russian expatriate sportspeople in the United States